The annual Research Conference on Communications, Information and Internet Policy (commonly referred to as TPRC based on its historical name Telecommunications Policy Research Conference) promotes interdisciplinary thinking on current and emerging issues in communications and the Internet by disseminating and discussing new research relevant to policy questions in the U.S. and around the world. It serves researchers, policymakers, and members of the private sector and civil society, from students to well-established practitioners.

Purpose and organization
The purpose of the conference is to acquaint those active in the policy-making field with the best of recent research and to familiarize researchers with the knowledge requirements of public policymakers and the various affected industries. The conference consists of panelists who present papers selected based on abstracts, as well as discussion panels and keynote speakers; the Program Committee of TPRC is responsible for the selection of all papers and presenters.
  
The Conference is organized by TPRC, Inc., a non-profit organization incorporated in the District of Columbia. TPRC is governed by an international board of Directors, consisting of individuals from the academy, industry, government, and non-profit sectors. The conference program is organized by a Program Committee.

Topics
TPRC welcomes legal, economic, social, and technical research affecting every aspect of national and international policy on communications, information, and the Internet, including but not limited to: voice, video, and data communications using wireline and wireless networks; traditional mass media including radio and television broadcasting, cable- and satellite-delivered communication; the growth and evolution of the Internet ecosystem; technological convergence and its implications for statutes, regulations, and treaties; intellectual property; electronic commerce; privacy and cybersecurity; and the role of communications, information, and the Internet in economic development.

The conference program includes papers, posters, panels, keynote speeches, a Student Paper Competition, the Graduate Student Consortium, and the Charles Benton Early Career Scholar Award.

Publication and archiving of papers
TPRC papers since 1997 have been archived at Social Science Research Network (SSRN), and can be found by searching there. Selected papers have been published from time to time in special issues of Telecommunications Policy  and The Journal of Information Policy.

Timeline for paper submission and selection 
A call for papers is typically circulated in January of each year. Abstracts are due in March and authors chosen to present are notified in June. To encourage participation by young and emerging scholars, TPRC also holds an international student paper competition with cash and in-kind prizes for the top three papers as selected by the Program Committee. This competition is based on full papers, typically due at the end of April.

TPRC 2019 (47th Anniversary) 
The 2019 conference took place September 20–21, 2019 at the Washington College of Law, Washington, DC.

Board of Directors 
The Board has between twelve and 20 members. Fernando Laguarda is 2018-2019 chair.

Past board chairs include
 Carleen Maitland
 Joe Waz
 Johannes Bauer
 John Horrigan
 Harold Furchtgott-Roth
 Mike Nelson
 Ben Compaine

Program Committee Chairs
Current and former chairs of the Program Committee

 2018: Rob Alderfer, CableLabs
 2017: Jon Gant, North Carolina Central University
 2016: Janice Hauge, University of North Texas
 2015: Jane Bambauer, University of Arizona
 2014: Carleen Maitland, Pennsylvania State University
 2013: Fernando Laguarda, American University Washington College of Law
 2011-2012: Pierre de Vries, University of Washington and University of Colorado at Boulder
 2010: James B. Speta, Northwestern University Law School
 2009: Douglas Sicker, University of Colorado at Boulder
 2008: L Jean Camp, Indiana University
 2006-2007: Martha A Garcia-Murillo, Syracuse University
 2005: John Horrigan, Pew Internet & American Life Project
 2003-2004: Robert Cannon, FCC

History 
TPRC was founded in 1972 by a group of regulators, governmental researchers and representatives of diverse academic communities who met at the first Telecommunications Policy Research Conference (subsequently renamed TPRC) organized by the Office of Telecommunications Policy in the White House. As communications policy has grown in importance to where the very term “telecommunications” is inadequate, the conference has evolved and expanded. TPRC saw the birth of the discourse on spectrum auctions. TPRC offered the first panel on the social and political implications of e-commerce in 1994. Conference topics have increasingly emphasized the interaction among disciplines, including network science and engineering, economics, law, and social sciences.

References

External links

Telecommunication conferences
Telecommunications policy